Patrick Joseph Hughes (28 February 1945 – 25 February 2010) was a Scottish footballer who played as a left winger in the Scottish League for St Mirren and Hamilton Academical and in the English Football League for Darlington. Although he played little, he was a member of the Darlington team that won promotion from the Fourth to the Third Division in 1965–66 Football League.

His older brother John played for Celtic and Scotland, and his younger brother Billy played for Sunderland and Scotland.

References

1945 births
2010 deaths
Footballers from Coatbridge
Scottish footballers
Association football wingers
Baillieston Juniors F.C. players
St Mirren F.C. players
Darlington F.C. players
Hamilton Academical F.C. players
Scottish Junior Football Association players
Scottish Football League players
English Football League players